Feeling Her Way is an art exhibition by Sonia Boyce shown in the British pavilion of the 2022 Venice Biennale.

References 

 
 
 
 
 
 
 

April 2022 events in Italy
59th Venice Biennale
Solo art exhibitions